Fusarium graminearum Genome Database (FGDB) is genomic database on Fusarium graminearum, a plant pathogen which causes the wheat headblight disease.

See also 
 Gibberella zeae

References

External links 
 http://mips.gsf.de/genre/proj/fusarium/ .

Gibberella
Fungal plant pathogens and diseases
Biological databases